Mate Grande is a volcanic caldera in Aysén Region, southern Chile. The volcano was discovered by geologists of the University of Chile and the discovery announced in 2021. It lies along the Liquiñe-Ofqui Fault. The volcano received the name Mate Grande in honor of the mate drink that is popular in southern Chile. Mate Grande hosts rocks that cooled from lava less than five thousand years old and is thus considered an active volcano. The diameter of caldera is about 5 km.

References

Calderas of Chile
Volcanoes of Aysén Region
Mate Grande
Mountains of Aysén Region
South Volcanic Zone